Nitesh Ganga Deb  is an Indian politician. He was elected to the Lok Sabha, lower house of the Parliament of India from Sambalpur, Odisha in the 2019 Indian general election as a member of the Bharatiya Janata Party. He is also the current titular King of the former princely state of Bamra(modern Deogarh district) and head of Bamanda branch of Eastern Ganga Dynasty.

He was the MLA of Deogarh Constituency till 2019.

References

Living people
India MPs 2019–present
Members of the Odisha Legislative Assembly
Lok Sabha members from Odisha
Bharatiya Janata Party politicians from Odisha
Year of birth missing (living people)
People from Sambalpur